A ground effect train is a conceptualized alternative to a magnetic levitation (maglev) train. In both cases the objective is to prevent the vehicle from making contact with the ground. Whereas a maglev train accomplishes this through the use of magnetism, a ground effect train uses an air cushion; either in the manner of a hovercraft (as in hovertrains) or using the "wing-in-ground-effect" design.

Details
The advantages of a ground effect train over a maglev are lower cost due to simpler construction. Disadvantages include either constant input of energy to keep the train hovering (in the case of hovercraft-like vehicles) or the necessity to keep the vehicle moving for it to remain off the ground (in the case of wing-in-ground effect vehicles). Furthermore, these vehicles may be very drastically affected by wind, air turbulence, and weather. Whereas the magnetic levitation train can be built to operate in a vacuum to minimise air resistance, the ground effect train must operate in an atmosphere in order for the air cushion to exist.

Development work has been undertaken in several countries since the middle 20th century. No ground effect train has entered regular commercial service.

Yusuke Sugahara and his team of researchers at Tohoku University, in Sendai, Japan have developed the Aero-Train that uses wings attached to a fuselage to literally fly inches off the ground. Dubbed a “ground-effect vehicle” the train is designed to be completely powered by wind and solar energy — making this a true zero-carbon transportation system.

See also 

 Hyperloop
 Aérotrain
 Gravity train 
 Ground effect vehicle
 High-speed rail
 Hovercraft
 Hovertrain
 Maglev train
 Transrapid 03
 Tracked Hovercraft

References

 Bastien, Stéphane, and Laframboise, M. Jacques (translation/adaptation) Aérotrain - The Aerotrain Story.  Retrieved 7 January 2011.
 Joseph George Ground Effect Vehicle, Physics-edu (private) website. . Retrieved 7 January 2011.
 Kikuchi Satoshi (Inst. Of Fluid Sci., Tohoku Univ.), Watanabe Hideo (Inst. Of Fluid Sci., Tohoku Univ.), Ota Fukuo (Inst. Of Fluid Sci., Tohoku Univ.), Kawahara Susumu (Inst. Of Fluid Sci., Tohoku Univ.), Kohama Yasuaki (Inst. Of Fluid Sci., Tohoku Univ.). Dynamic Stability Control of Ground Effect Train, Nihon Kikai Gakkai Nenji Taikai Koen Ronbunshu, Japan, 2000, Vol.4, pp. 297–298, Journal Code:X0587B. (Japanese)
 Shonner website Rohr Industries Aérotrain - The Rohr Aerotrain Tracked Air-Cushion Vehicle (TACV), Shonner.com website. Retrieved 7 January 2011.
 Sleath, M. News In Science: Flying Trains, ABC Science website. Retrieved 7 January 2011.

External links 

 Aero-Train - A Japanese prototype, also called "Flow around Ground Effect Transport System (FGETS)" 
 Rohr Industries Aérotrain
 Aero-Train Video
 This Train Will Have Passengers Riding On Air

Emerging technologies

de:Luftkissenbahn
vi:Tàu đệm khí